Marc Lacroix may refer to:
 Marc Lacroix (biochemist) (born 1963), Belgian biochemist
 Marc Lacroix (photographer) (1927–2007), French photographer